The 1971 World Wrestling Championships were held in Sofia, Bulgaria.

Medal table

Team ranking

Medal summary

Men's freestyle

Men's Greco-Roman

References
FILA Database

World Wrestling Championships
World Wrestling Championships, 1971
1971 in Bulgarian sport
International wrestling competitions hosted by Bulgaria